Heshana Qaghan or Heshana Khagan (Chinese: 曷娑那可汗, (Pinyin): hésuōnà kěhàn, (Wade-Giles): ho-so-na k'o-han, Middle Chinese (Guangyun)  or 曷薩那可汗/曷萨那可汗, hésànà kěhàn, ho-sa-na k'o-han;  at one point known as Chuluo Kehan (處羅可汗/处罗可汗) and Nijue Chuluo Khagan (泥厥處羅可汗/泥厥处罗可汗), personal name Ashina Daman (阿史那達漫/阿史那达漫, āshǐnà dámàn, a-shih-na ta-man) -  was the second khagan of the Western Turkic Khaganate. He was the son of Niri Qaghan. He appeared as Čôl χâɣân in The Provincial Capitals of Iran.

Reign 
Not much is known about his reign. He appointed lesser khagans.

He was said to be collecting excessive taxes from the Tiele, leading to resentment among the tribes of the Tiele. Khagan thus suspected the Tiele chieftains and, on one occasion, gathered some 100 Tiele chieftains and slaughtered them. Tiele thereafter rebelled and supported Geleng (歌楞), the chieftain of the Qibi (契苾), as the Yiwuzhenmohe Khan (易勿真莫賀可汗). They also supported Yishibo as Yiedie Khan, as a subordinate khan under Geleng. About 605 Tiele rebels drove him from Dzungaria to the Ili River area. 

Pei Ju suggested forming an alliance with khagan's subordinate Sheguy, who had been requesting to marry a Sui princess. Emperor Yang agreed and subsequently, Sheguy attacked khagan, defeating him and forcing him to flee to Gaochang.  Emperor Yang then sent Pei to Gaochang to persuade Daman to come to Sui. Khagan refused at first. However, after being threatened that his mother would be killed, he had to agree. He subsequently stayed in China and did not return to his own land.  Emperor Yang, pleased with this development, awarded Pei with a sable coat and jewels that Daman offered as tribute.

In 611, he was created Heshana Khagan (曷薩那可汗) by imperial decree and was married to a Chinese princess.

By 619, he was no longer in control of his khaganate and was at Chang'an, the capital of China's Tang Dynasty, when Emperor Gaozu of Tang, giving in to Shibi khagan's pressure, had him delivered to Eastern Turk emissaries to be executed.

He was survived by two sons who were in service of Tang dynasty thereafter.

References

619 deaths
Göktürk khagans
Executed royalty
7th-century monarchs in Asia
Year of birth unknown
Ashina house of the Turkic Empire
7th-century Turkic people